Ptychopseustis eutacta is a moth in the family Crambidae. It is found in Australia, where it has been recorded from Queensland.

The wingspan is about 13 mm. The forewings are whitish-ochreous with some brownish-ochreous suffusion and a paler median area. There are some dark-fuscous scales on the costal edge, as well as a broad dark-fuscous transverse line containing some whitish scales. The hindwings are whitish with a
faint fuscous subterminal line.

References

Cybalomiinae
Moths described in 1908